Shao Shuai (born 10 March 1997) is a Chinese footballer currently playing as a defender in China League Two for Yanbian Longding.

Club career
Shao Shuai would be promoted to the Beijing Renhe senior team within the 2019 Chinese Super League season and would go on to make his debut in the Chinese FA Cup on 30 April 2019 against Liaoning F.C. in a 1-0 victory. On 20 April 2021, Shao would transfer to second tier football club Heilongjiang Ice City.

Career statistics

References

External links

1997 births
Living people
Chinese footballers
Association football defenders
Chinese Super League players
Beijing Guoan F.C. players